There is a community of Japanese people in Germany (or Nihonjin in Germany) consisting mainly of expatriates from Japan as well as German citizens of Japanese descent.

Demographics

In 1932 Berlin was the home of about 20% of all of the Japanese people in Europe and Germany had become a centre for Japanese people sent by the Japanese Ministry of Education to study in Europe. In 1936 the Japanese people were declared Honorary Aryans by the Nazis. At the time of the 1941 Attack on Pearl Harbor about 300 Japanese people lived in Berlin. Around that time fewer than 200 Japanese women and children previously in Germany returned to Japan by ship. They boarded the Yasukunimaru, a ship operated by NYK Line, in Hamburg.

In 1963 there were 800 Japanese people in Hamburg, including 50 children.

In 1985 there were about 16,500 Japanese persons living in West Germany. The largest group, making up about 6,000, resided in Düsseldorf, and there were other Japanese communities in Berlin and Hamburg. At this time, over 90% of ethnic Japanese households in West Germany had an affluent corporate executive as the head of the household. This executive often stayed in Germany for three to five years, and company employees arriving in Germany often move into residences formerly occupied by those returning to Japan.

Tourism
In 1975, 195,350 Japanese people visited West Germany. In 1984 that figure was about 400,000.

Education

There are five nihonjin gakkō (Japanese international elementary and junior schools operated by Japanese associations) in Germany:
 Japanische Internationale Schule zu Berlin
 Japanische Internationale Schule in Düsseldorf
 Japanische Internationale Schule Frankfurt
 Japanische Schule in Hamburg
 Japanische Internationale Schule München

The Toin Gakuen Schule Deutschland, a Japanese boarding high school/gymnasium in Bad Saulgau classified as a shiritsu zaigai kyōiku shisetsu (overseas branch of a Japanese private school) was scheduled to close in 2012.

Hoshū jugyō kō (supplementary/weekend Japanese schools) include:
Japanische Ergänzungsschule in Berlin e.V. (ベルリン日本語補習授業校 Berurin Nihongo Hoshū Jugyō Kō) - Charlottenburg-Wilmersdorf, Berlin
Zentrale Schule fur Japanisch Berlin e.V. (共益法人ベルリン中央学園補習授業校 Kyōeki Hōjin Berurin Chūō Gakuen Hoshū Jugyō Kō) - Wilmersdorf, Berlin - Established April 1997.
Japanische Schule Bonn e.V. (ボン日本語補習授業校 Bon Nihongo Hoshū Jugyō Kō)
Japanisches Institut in Bremen (ブレーメン日本語補習授業校 Burēmen Nihongo Hoshū Jugyō Kō) 
Japanische Schule Köln e.V. (ケルン日本語補習授業校 Kerun Nihongo Hoshū Jugyō Kō) - Kalk, Cologne
Japanische Ergänzungsschule in Dresden (ドレスデン日本語補習校 Doresuden Nihongo Hoshūkō)
Japanische Ergänzungsschule in Düsseldorf
Forderschule fur Japankunde in Düsseldorf e.V.
Japanisches Institut Frankfurt am Main (フランクフルト補習学校 Furankufuruto Hoshū Jugyō Kō)
It conducts its classes in the Japanese day school of Frankfurt's building.
Japanisches Institut Hamburg (ハンブルグ補習授業校 Hanburugu Hoshū Jugyō Kō) - Halstenbek
It was established on June 15, 1963. It has conducted its classes at the Japanische Schule in Hamburg since 1994. As of 2013 it has 100 students, with about 70% of them from mixed Japanese and German relationships. The school has mathematics, geography, and Japanese history classes, all taught in the Japanese language. As of 2013 pupils under 15 years of age have tuitions of 84 euros per month per child while those 15 and older have tuitions of 100 euros per month per child.
Japanische Ergänzungsschule Heidelberg e.V. (ハイデルベルク日本語授業補習校 Haideruberugu Nihongo Hoshū Jugyō Kō)
Japanisches Institut in München e.V. (JIM; ミュンヘン日本語補習授業校 Myunhen Nihongo Hoshū Jugyō Kō) - Munich
Usually the school holds its classes in the Mathilde-Eller Schule but if that location is unavailable it holds its classes in the Munich Japanese day school building.
Japanische Kulturvereinigung in Nurnberg e.V. (ニュンベルグ補習授業校 Nyunberugu Hoshū Jugyō Kō) - Nuremberg
Japanische Schule Stuttgart e.V. (シュツットガルト日本語補習授業校 Shutsuttogaruto Nihongo Hoshū Jugyō Kō)

Notable individuals
 Ida Friederike Görres, writer and the younger sister of Richard von Coudenhove-Kalergi
 Ken Asaeda, footballer
 Blumio, rapper
 Kimiko Douglass-Ishizaka, pianist, Olympic weightlifter and powerlifter
 Nic Endo, musician
 Erika Ikuta, musical actress
 Sadakichi Hartmann, photography critic and poet
 Tetsuya Kakihara, voice actor and singer
 Rubina Kuraoka, voice actress
 Liza Kennedy, fashion model
 Jun Märkl, conductor
 Alice Sara Ott, pianist
 Yuki Stalph, footballer
 Arabella Steinbacher, violinist
 Damo Suzuki, musician
 Mari Vartmann, pair skater
 Subaru Kimura, voice actor
 Takeo Ishii, yodeler

See also
 Germany–Japan relations
 List of Japanese ministers, envoys and ambassadors to Germany

References

Asian diaspora in Germany
Ethnic groups in Germany
German